I'm Just a Rock 'n' Roll Singer is the third album released by progressive rock band Lucifer's Friend in 1973. This album marks the point where they completely turn away from dark lyrics and heavy metal sound.

Track listing

Personnel
 John Lawton – lead vocals 
 Peter Hecht – keyboards
 Dieter Horns – bass, vocals 
 Peter Hesslein – lead guitars, vocals 
 Joachim Reitenbach – drums

Guest musicians
 Herbert Bornhold - percussion
 Herb Geller – soprano saxophone on "Blind Freedom"
 Bob Lanese – trumpet on "Blind Freedom"

External links

References

Lucifer's Friend albums
1973 albums
Repertoire Records albums
Vertigo Records albums